Longueville may refer to:

Places

France
Longueville, Calvados, in the Calvados department
Longueville, Lot-et-Garonne, in the Lot-et-Garonne department
Longueville, Manche, in the Manche department
Longueville, Pas-de-Calais, in the Pas-de-Calais department
Longueville, Seine-et-Marne, in the Seine-et-Marne department
Longueville-sur-Aube, in the Aube department
Longueville-sur-Scie, in the Seine-Maritime department

Elsewhere
Longueville, Jersey 
Longueville, New South Wales, suburb of Sydney, Australia

Other
County of Longueville
Duke of Longueville
Pichon Longueville, archaic Bordeaux wine estate, presently:
Château Pichon Longueville Baron, or Pichon Baron
Château Pichon Longueville Comtesse de Lalande, or Pichon Comtesse, or Pichon Lalande
Longueville baronets, an extinct baronetcy, originally of Nova Scotia and then of Great Britain
Longueville or Rongubiru, fictional secretary in The Familiar of Zero